Look is the seventh studio album by Beth Nielsen Chapman, released April 5, 2005. It reached number 63 in the UK Albums Chart.

Critical reception
Sue Keogh of the BBC writes "If you like well-crafted music for grown-ups, she's not to be missed. Listening to Beth Nielsen Chapman is like listening to any Mary Chapin Carpenter, Kate Campbell or Sarah McLachlan record; it's your older, more sensible sister talking."

Will Layman of Pop Matters says "Beth Nielsen Chapman is a rare creature; a songwriter first and a performer second. Lots of sensitively expressed feelings here, kids. Nice songs."

Track listing

Track information and credits taken from the album's liner notes.

Personnel
Beth Nielsen Chapman - vocals, acoustic guitar, mandolin, piano, organ, keyboards, shaker, string arrangements
Bekka Bramlett - tambourine
Tom Bukovac - electric guitar, acoustic guitar
John Catchings - cello
Ernest Chapman - vocal duet on "Your Love Stays", string arrangements
Patrick Doyle - string arrangements
Dan Dugmore - pedal steel guitar, lap steel guitar, dobro
Bruce Gaitsch - acoustic guitar, electric guitar
John Jorgenson - acoustic guitar, electric guitar
Viktor Krauss - bass 
David Leonard - drums
Bill Lloyd - bass, guitar
Jerry Marotta - drums
Michael McDonald - backing vocals
Chris Pelcer - keyboards, string arrangements
Andrew Ramsey - acoustic guitar, electric guitar
Annie Roboff - keyboards, vocals
Matt Rollings - piano
Emily Saliers - backing vocals
Crystal Taliefero - alto saxophone, percussion, vocals
Kristin Wilkinson - string arrangements
Reese Wynans - Hammond B3 organ
Craig Young - bass

References

External links
Beth Nielsen Chapman Official Site
Compass Records Official Site

2005 albums
Beth Nielsen Chapman albums
Compass Records albums